Georges-Vanier station is a Montreal Metro station in the borough of Le Sud-Ouest in Montreal, Quebec, Canada. It is operated by the Société de transport de Montréal (STM) and serves the Orange Line. It is located in the Little Burgundy area.

Overview 

The station, designed by architect Pierre-W. Major, is a normal side platform station, and has one access. The huge underground volume of the station mezzanine is lighted by a single, round skylight, and is decorated with a sculpture, Un arbre dans le parc, by Michel Dernuet, is situated on the Côte-Vertu platform; it is a large concrete pillar with illuminated branches, representing a tree. The wall facing the easternmost stairs for the Montmorency platform is faced with blue ceramic symbolizing a fresh spring in the woods.

In most years, this station is the least used in the network since it is the only one with no connecting bus route; it was 68th of 68 in traffic in 2011, with 773,078 passengers embarking here.

Origin of the name
This station is named for the boul. Georges-Vanier, named for the Rt. Hon. Georges-Philias Vanier. Born a few steps from the street that now bears his name, Major-General Vanier was a distinguished soldier in World War I and Canada's ambassador to all Allied governments in World War II. He served as the 19th Governor General of Canada, the first French-Canadian to occupy that position, from 1959 until his death.

Nearby points of interest
Centre communautaire Bon-Pasteur
Black Community Centre
Canadian Centre for Architecture
Église St. Anthony of Padua

2008 station closure
On May 26, 2008 the STM announced the temporary closure of the Georges-Vanier station from June 2, 2008 to September 5, 2008 due to major repairs needed at the station.

References

External links
Georges-Vanier Station - official site
Montreal by Metro, metrodemontreal.com - photos, information, and trivia
 2011 STM System Map
 2011 Downtown System Map
 Metro Map

Orange Line (Montreal Metro)
Railway stations in Canada opened in 1980
Le Sud-Ouest
1980 establishments in Quebec